Fairmont Creamery Company Building may refer to:

Fairmont Creamery (Moorhead, MN)
Fairmont Creamery Company Building (Fairmont, Nebraska), listed on the National Register of Historic Places in Fillmore County, Nebraska
Fairmont Creamery Company Building (Rapid City, South Dakota), listed on the National Register of Historic Places in Pennington County, South Dakota